Zelopsis nothofagi is a species of leafhopper than is endemic to New Zealand.



Taxonomy 
Zelopsis nothofagi was described in 1966.

Description 
Depending on sex, Zelopsis nothofagi is between 3–4 mm in length.

Distribution and Habitat 
Zelopsis nothofagi is widespread on the North Island and South Island of New Zealand. The leafhopper is known to occur in predominantly from lowland to subalpine zones in Nothofagus forest habitat.

References 

Eurymelinae